Bruno's GmbH  is a German retailer of products targeted toward gay men; it was originally founded in 1981 as Bruno Gmünder Verlag, a book publishing house. Bruno Gmünder Verlag was dissolved in 2017, with the retail division becoming Bruno's and the publishing division sold to the publishing company Salzgeber & Co Medien GmbH in September 2018.

History 

Bruno Gmünder Verlag was founded in Berlin in 1981 by Bruno Gmünder and Christian von Maltzahn. The publishing house was best known for Männer, a gay male lifestyle magazine, and the Spartacus International Gay Guide, the best-selling travel guidebook for gay men in the world. Bruno Gmünder had purchased the latter in 1986 following financial difficulties with the former owner John D. Stamford, as well as increasing evidence that the Guide was being used by paedophiles to abuse children in developing countries. Under Bruno Gmünder the Guide significantly reduced the pro-paedophilia content, though various aspects remained during the period 1987–1994.

In October 2012, the Bruno Gmünder Group offered a "bounty" of €15,000 for information leading to the investigation and final conviction of the operators of the right-wing extremist and homophobic blog kreuz.net. The Roman Catholic theologian David Berger has taken over the coordination of the resulting campaign Stoppt kreuz.net. In a letter to the German Bishops' Conference, the group asked them to support the campaign.

The company declared bankruptcy in 2014, but was purchased by private investor Frank Zahn. When Zahn died unexpectedly in February 2017 the company again declared bankruptcy. The retail division and four retail outlets became Bruno's GmbH, while the publishing arm was acquired by Salzgeber in 2018 and merged into Männerschwarm Verlag.

References

External links 
 

Book publishing companies of Germany
LGBT-related mass media in Germany
Publishing companies established in 1981
1981 establishments in West Germany
Publishing companies disestablished in 2017
Retail companies of Germany
Companies based in Berlin
German companies established in 1981
Pedophile advocacy